The Swedish Voluntary Radio Organization (FRO) is a Swedish volunteer defense organization (a signals auxiliary) that aims to maintain and develop excellence in Communications and Information systems (Information Technology - and radio communication). FRO trains radio operators, technicians, squad leaders and communications staff for the Swedish Home Guard and civilian operators for the Swedish Civil Contingencies Agency, the Swedish Transport Administration and the Svenska Kraftnät (the Swedish electricity and natural gas transmission system operator).

The organisation has a coat of arms with the following blazon: “The blue field is a forked flash of gold with the tips pointing at the shield head and foot.”

See also 
Home Guard
Swedish Voluntary Flying Corps
Swedish Auxiliary Naval Corps

References

External links 
 Official website

Military organizations established in 1946
Military of Sweden
Volunteer organizations